"Never Enough" is a song performed by Loren Allred for the film The Greatest Showman (2017). It is the second track from soundtrack of the film, The Greatest Showman: Original Motion Picture Soundtrack, released in the same year. A reimagined version was performed by American singer Kelly Clarkson.

Charts

Certifications

Reprise

"Never Enough (Reprise)" is the reprise of the song "Never Enough" from The Greatest Showman: Original Motion Picture Soundtrack

Certifications

Reimagined version

For The Greatest Showman: Reimagined (2018), the song was covered by American singer Kelly Clarkson.

Charts

References

2017 songs
Kelly Clarkson songs
Songs written by Benj Pasek
Songs written by Justin Paul (songwriter)
Songs from The Greatest Showman
Songs from Pasek and Paul musicals